The following is a timeline of the history of the city of Naples. The Naples area has been inhabited since the Neolithic period. The earliest historical sources in the area were left by the Myceneans in the 2nd millennium BC. During its long history, Naples has been captured, destroyed and attacked many times. The city has seen earthquakes, volcanic eruptions, foreign invasions and revolutions.

Prior to 12th century

 2nd millennium BC – first Mycenaean settlements established in the Naples area (Afragola).
 6th C.BCE – Parthenope was refounded as Neapolis.
 327 BCE – Naples makes an alliance with Rome, and enters its sphere of influence.
 37 BCE – Crypta Neapolitana built (approximate date).
 45 CE - Birth of Statius a poet, he also lived in Naples. 
 79 CE – Big eruption of Vesuvius: many towns near Naples are destroyed (Pompeii, Herculaneum, etc.).
 190 CE – Catholic Diocese of Naples established (approximate date).
 3rd C. CE – Catacombs of San Gennaro in use.
 ca.511 CE – The last Western Roman Emperor, Romulus Augustulus, dies in Naples.
 536 CE – Siege and capture of Naples by the Byzantines.
 542–543 CE – Siege and capture of Naples by the Goths. 
 615 – Rebellion.
 638 – Duchy of Naples created.
 763 – Naples becomes an independent duchy.
 830s – Naples is threatened by Sicard of Benevento.
 10th C. – Roman Catholic Archdiocese of Naples established.
 902 – After numerous assaults, the Neapolitans defeat the Saracens on the Garigliano River.

12th–16th centuries

 1027-30 - Pandulf IV of Capua in power. 
 12th C. - Castel Capuano built.
 1139 – Ruggiero the Norman enters in the city.
 1165 – The first castle of Naples: Castel Capuano.
 1191 – Naples manages to resist the Swabians after a siege from May to August.
 1194 – Naples is conquered by the Swabians.
 1224 – University founded.
 1266 – Charles of Anjou in power. Naples becomes  the capital of the Kingdom of Sicily.
 1282 – Castel Nuovo built.
 1309 – Robert of Anjou is proclaimed King of Naples.
 1313 – Naples Cathedral built.
 1340 – Santa Chiara built.
 1343
 Sant'Elmo expanded.
 Tsunami.
 1349 – Earthquake.
 1368 – Certosa di San Martino inaugurated.
 1382 – Argonauts of Saint Nicholas instituted.
 1438 – Renato of Anjou is the king of Naples.
 1442 – Alfonso V of Aragon conquers Naples. Naples became the capital of the Crown of Aragon.
 1471 – Printing press in operation.
 1485 – Ferrante I of Naples prevents the revolt of the Barons.
 1487 – Villa Poggio Reale construction begun by Alfonso II
 1495 – Charles VIII of France conquers Naples.
 1503 – Naples added to the Spanish Empire.
 1528 – Siege of Naples.
 1532 – Don Pedro de Toledo is the new Viceroy; he promotes the expansion of the city.
 1550 – La Commedia theatre built (approximate date).
 1560 – Academia Secretorum Naturae (learned society) formed.
 1564 - Sant'Antonio delle Monache a Port'Alba built.

17th century
 1600 – Royal Palace of Naples construction begins.
 1620 –  (theatre) built.
 1631 – Big eruption of Vesuvius, many little towns near Naples are destroyed.
 1636 –  built.
 1639 – Treaty of Naples signed between Poland and Spain.
 1647 – Rebellion against the king (Philip III) and his viceroys; Neapolitan Republic created and later suppressed.

 1650
 Spire of San Gennaro erected
 Performance of opera Didone.
 Naples with about 400,000 people becomes the largest cities of the Spanish Empire.
 1654 – Archbishop's Palace expanded.
 1656
 Plague.
 Fontanelle cemetery established.
 1667 – San Gennaro dei Poveri founded.
 1694 – 28 January: Premiere of Alessandro Scarlatti's opera Pirro e Demetrio.

18th century

 1701 – Conspiracy of Macchia.
 1707 – Naples is conquered by the Austrians.
 1730 – Palazzo Serra di Cassano built.
 1732 – Chinese Institute founded.
 1734 – Charles of Bourbon is proclaimed King of Naples.
 1737
 Teatro di San Carlo inaugurated. 
 Spire of San Domenico erected.
 1738 – Re-discovery of Herculaneum.
 1742 – Palace of Capodimonte built.
 1743 – Capodimonte porcelain manufactory established.
 1750 – Spire of the Immaculate Virgin erected.
 1759 – Charles VII is succeeded by Ferdinand IV.
 1751 – Ospedale L'Albergo Reale dei Poveri construction begins.
 1757 – Museo di Capodimonte opens.
 1778 – Palazzo Doria d'Angri built.
 1779 – Teatro del Real Fondo di Separazione opens.
 1780 - Villa Comunale built. 
 1790's - Biblioteca Nazionale Vittorio Emanuele III founded. 
 1790 – Teatro San Ferdinando built.
 1799 – Parthenopean Republic and Army of Naples formed.

19th century
 1804 – Reale Biblioteca di Napoli opens.
 1805 – Anglo-Russian invasion.
 1806 – Napoleon grants the Kingdom of Naples to his brother Joseph.
 1807 – Botanical Garden established.
 1808 – Gioacchin Murat is the new King of Naples. He promotes administrative reforms and public works.
 1811 – Zoological Museum founded.
 1815 – Naples is against the Austrian Empire. The intervention by Austria caused resentment in Italy, which further spurred on the drive towards Italian unification.
 1816
 City becomes capital of Kingdom of the Two Sicilies.
 L'Hortus Camaldulensis di Napoli established.
 Real Museo Borbonico inaugurated.
 1819 – Villa Floridiana built.
 1820 – Revolution of July.
 1821 – Flag of Naples red and yellow design adopted.
 1825 - Palazzo San Giacomo construction completed.
 1826
 English Cemetery established.
 Villa Pignatelli built.
 1835 – Premiere of Donizetti's opera Lucia di Lammermoor.
 1839 – Napoli-Portici railway begins operating.
 1848 – The revolutionary movements produce a parliament and a new constitution, but the following year the parliament is dissolved.
 1859 – Francesco II is the last King of the Two Sicilies.
 1860 -  Plebiscite taken on October 21, 1860, to bring Naples into the unified Kingdom of Italy under the House of Savoy.
 1860 – Constitution.
 1861 – Garibaldi arrives.
 1862 - Anglican church in Vico San Pasquale built.
 1867
 Napoli Centrale railway station built. 
 Majello porcelain manufactory established.
 1869 – Villa Comunale opens.
 1870 – Many revolts against the unitary state, particularly in the countryside. This is the principle of the "southern question".
 1871 – Population: 448,743.
 1875 –  (history society) founded.
 1880 – Club Africano di Napoli founded (later Società africana d'Italia).
 1882 – Filangieri Museum opens.
 1883 –  (shopping arcade) built.
 1884 – Cholera epidemic.  One year later is proclaimed the big "Restoration of Naples".

 1890
 Circumvesuviana founded.
 Galleria Umberto I founded. 
 1891 – Galleria Umberto I built.
 1892 – Il Mattino begins publication.
 1897 – Population: 536,073.

20th century

 1901 - Population: 547,503.
 1906 – Mount Vesuvius erupts.
 1907 - Rome–Formia–Naples railway construction begins.
 1925 – Stadio Arturo Collana opens. In September, opening of the Metro Fs, the current Line 2 (first in Italy).
 1926 – S.S.C. Napoli football club founded.
 1929 – Naples hosts the 1929 World Fencing Championships.
 1930
 Parthenope University of Naples established.
 Parco Virgiliano (Mergellina) established (approximate date).
 1940 – Bombing begins. Inauguration of the Mostra d'Oltremare: an expositive and entertainment complex promoted by the Fascist regime.

 1943
 September – Four days of Naples.
 October – Post-office bombing.
 1944 – Naples is occupied by the Americans. In the same year, the last eruption of Vesuvius.
 1945 – With the film The Millions of Naples, start the successes of the works of Eduardo De Filippo.
 1950 – Naples Airport operating commercial flights.
 1954 – Naples hosts The International Exhibition of Navigation.
 1959 – Stadio San Paolo opens.
 1960 - Napoli Centrale railway station rebuilt.
 1963 – The film "Hands on the city," is the strong complaint of the political and social climate of the time.
 1969 – Naples co-hosts the EuroBasket 1969.
 1971 – Population of the Comune (administrative limits): 1,250,000.
 1975 – Vele di Scampia built.
 1980 – 1980 Irpinia earthquake destroys many little towns near Naples.
 1981 – Kidnapping of Ciro Cirillo.
 1982 – Inauguration of the business district, the Centro Direzionale.
 1987 – S.S.C. Napoli wins its first Italian football championship.
 1988 – Bombing.
 1989 – S.S.C. Napoli wins the 1988–89 UEFA Cup.
 1990 – City hosts FIFA World Cup.
 1993 – Line 1 (Naples Metro) begins operating.
 1994 – City hosts 20th G7 summit.
 1995 – Telecom Italia Tower built.
 1996 – Città della Scienza founded.
 1997 – Corriere del Mezzogiorno begins publication.
 2000 – Secret Museum re-opens.

21st century

 2001 – Coral Jewellery Museum opens.
 2002 – Università degli Studi di Napoli "L'Orientale" active.
 2005 – Rome–Naples high-speed railway begins operating.
 2006 – il Napoli newspaper begins publication.
 2007
 Line 6 (Naples Metro) begins operating.
 The waste emergency, the uncontrolled crime disfigure the image of Naples in the world.
 2009 - Rome–Naples high-speed railway opened.
 2010 – Circumvesuviana derailment.
 2011 – Luigi de Magistris becomes mayor.
 2012
 Milan-Naples Nuovo Trasporto Viaggiatori (train) begins operating.
 World Urban Forum held.
 2016 – June: Naples municipal election, 2016 held.
 2017 - Neapolitan pizzaiolo added to the UNESCO Intangible Cultural Heritage List.
 2019 – Naples hosts the 2019 Summer Universiade.

See also
 History of Naples
 List of mayors of Naples

Other cities in the macroregion of South Italy:(it)
 Timeline of Bari, Apulia region
 Timeline of Brindisi, Apulia
 Timeline of L'Aquila, Abruzzo region
 Timeline of Reggio Calabria
 Timeline of Salerno, Campania region
 Timeline of Taranto, Apulia

References

Bibliography

Published in the 19th century

Published in the 20th century
  + 1867 ed.

Published in the 21st century

External links
 Europeana. Items related to Naples, various dates.

 
Naples